Megalo Seirini is a village and a community of the Grevena municipality. Before the 2011 local government reform it was a part of the municipality of Grevena, of which it was a municipal district. The 2011 census recorded 461 residents in the village and 555 residents in the community. The community of Megalo Seirini covers an area of 18.804 km2.

Administrative division
The community of Megalo Seirini consists of two separate settlements: 
Megalo Seirini (population 461)
Mikro Seirini (population 94)
The aforementioned population figures are as of 2011.

Population
According to the 2011 census, the population of the settlement of Megalo Seirini was 461 people, a decrease of almost 19% compared to the previous census of 2001.

See also
 List of settlements in the Grevena regional unit

References

Populated places in Grevena (regional unit)
Villages in Greece